The 1st Marine Division is a Marine infantry division of the United States Marine Corps headquartered at Marine Corps Base Camp Pendleton, California. It is the ground combat element of the I Marine Expeditionary Force (I MEF).

Founded in 1941, with individual units dating back before then, it is the oldest and largest active duty division in the United States Marine Corps, representing a combat-ready force of more than 19,000 men and women. It is one of three active duty divisions in the Marine Corps today and is a multi-role, expeditionary ground combat force. It is nicknamed "The Old Breed".

The 1st Division saw combat service during almost all major conflicts during the 20th century. It participated in World War I (only 5th and 11th Marine Regiments of the future Division served in France), World War II, Korean War, Vietnam War, Gulf War, Somali Civil War, Iraq War and War in Afghanistan.

Commanding generals

See also
 List of United States Marine Corps divisions
 List of 1st Marine Aircraft Wing Commanders
 List of 2nd Marine Division Commanders
 List of 3rd Marine Division Commanders
 List of Historically Important U.S. Marines
 List of United States Marine Corps aircraft wings
 List of active United States Marine Corps aircraft squadrons

References

1st Marine Division (United States)
United States Marine Corps generals